Valery Statsenko (born 15 August 1968) is a Russian diver. He competed at the 1992 Summer Olympics and the 1996 Summer Olympics.

References

1968 births
Living people
Russian male divers
Olympic divers of the Unified Team
Olympic divers of Russia
Divers at the 1992 Summer Olympics
Divers at the 1996 Summer Olympics
Place of birth missing (living people)